Nicolas Perez (born October 26, 1990) is a French footballer who plays for Luxembourg side FC UNA Strassen.

Career
Perez played in the UEFA Champions League qualifiers against MOL Vidi FC and played in the Luxembourgers successful run to the UEFA Europa League group stages beating CFR Cluj and Legia Warsaw. Perez joined FC UNA Strassen in the summer of 2021.

References

Living people
1990 births
French footballers
F91 Dudelange players
Association football forwards